Harlebach  is a river of North Rhine-Westphalia, Germany. It is a  tributary of the river Alme in North Rhine-Westphalia, Germany.
It joins the Alme through forested areas including the Almetal nature reserve. It acts as the boundary between Paderborn and Hochsauerlandkreis.

See also
List of rivers of North Rhine-Westphalia

References

Rivers of North Rhine-Westphalia
Rivers of Germany